was a town located in Haguri District, Aichi Prefecture, Japan.

On April 1, 2005, Kisogawa, along with the city of Bisai, was merged into the expanded city of Ichinomiya.

As of 2003, the town had an estimated population of 31,684 and a density of 3,331.65 persons per km². The total area was 9.51 km².

Dissolved municipalities of Aichi Prefecture
Ichinomiya, Aichi